The 2015 UEFA Women's Under-17 Championship was the eighth edition of the UEFA Women's Under-17 Championship, the annual European youth football competition contested by the women's under-17 national teams of the member associations of UEFA. Iceland hosted the tournament. Players born on or after 1 January 1998 were eligible to participate in this competition.

Each match lasted 80 minutes, consisting of two halves of 40 minutes, with an interval of 15 minutes.

Qualification

A total of 44 UEFA nations entered the competition, and with the hosts Iceland qualifying automatically, the other 43 teams competed in the qualifying competition to determine the remaining seven spots in the final tournament. The qualifying competition consisted of two rounds: Qualifying round, which took place in autumn 2014, and Elite round, which took place in spring 2015.

Qualified teams
The following eight teams qualified for the final tournament.

Notes

Final draw
The final draw was held in Reykjavík, Iceland on 29 April 2015, 11:30 WET (UTC±0). The eight teams were drawn into two groups of four teams. There were no seeding except that the hosts Iceland were assigned to position A1 in the draw.

Venues
The competition was played at six venues in four host cities.
Grindavíkurvöllur, Grindavík
Kópavogsvöllur, Kópavogur
Akranesvöllur, Akranes
Vikingsvöllur, Reykjavík
Fylkisvöllur, Reykjavík
Valsvöllur, Reykjavík

Squads
Each national team had to submit a squad of 18 players.

Match officials
A total of 6 referees, 8 assistant referees and 2 fourth officials were appointed for the final tournament.

Referees
 Barbara Bollenberg (Austria)
 Ivana Martinčić (Croatia)
 Vivian Peeters (Netherlands)
 Graziella Pirriatore (Italy)
 Ivana Projkovska (Macedonia)
 Viola Raudziņa (Latvia)

Assistant referees
 Liana Grigoryan (Armenia)
 Aleksandra Kojović (Serbia)
 Julia Magnusson (Sweden)
 Slavomira Majkuthová (Slovakia)
 Androniki Nioti (Greece)
 Rúna Stefánsdóttir (Iceland)
 Maryna Striletska (Ukraine)
 Bjorn Valdimarsson (Iceland)

Fourth officials
 Dimitrina Milkova (Bulgaria)
 Lois Otte (Belgium)

Group stage

Group winners and runners-up advanced to the semi-finals.

Tiebreakers
if two or more teams were equal on points on completion of the group matches, the following tie-breaking criteria were applied, in the order given, to determine the rankings:
 Higher number of points obtained in the group matches played among the teams in question;
 Superior goal difference resulting from the group matches played among the teams in question;
 Higher number of goals scored in the group matches played among the teams in question;
 If, after having applied criteria 1 to 3, teams still had an equal ranking, criteria 1 to 3 were reapplied exclusively to the group matches between the teams in question to determine their final rankings. If this procedure did not lead to a decision, criteria 5 to 9 applied;
 Superior goal difference in all group matches;
 Higher number of goals scored in all group matches;
 If only two teams had the same number of points, and they were tied according to criteria 1 to 6 after having met in the last round of the group stage, their rankings were determined by a penalty shoot-out (not used if more than two teams had the same number of points, or if their rankings were not relevant for qualification for the next stage).
 Lower disciplinary points total based only on yellow and red cards received in the group matches (red card = 3 points, yellow card = 1 point, expulsion for two yellow cards in one match = 3 points);
 Drawing of lots.

All times were local, WET (UTC±0).

Group A

Group B

Knockout stage
In the knockout stage, penalty shoot-out was used to decide the winner if necessary (no extra time was played).

There was no third place match for this edition of the tournament as it was not used as a qualifier for the FIFA U-17 Women's World Cup (since expansion to eight teams).

Bracket

Semi-finals

Final

Goalscorers
6 goals
 Stefanie Sanders

5 goals
 Lucía García

3 goals
 Géraldine Reuteler

2 goals

 Ingrid Kvernvolden
 Amira Arfaoui

1 goal

 Georgia Allen
 Zoe Cross
 Charlotte Devlin
 Ashleigh Plumptre
 Elisa De Almeida
 Hélène Fercocq
 Sarah Galera
 Marie-Antoinette Katoto
 Emelyne Laurent
 Jule Dallmann
 Victoria Krug
 Dina Orschmann
 Tanja Pawollek
 Andrea Mist Pálsdóttir
 Jenny Norem
 Andrea Wilmann
 Aitana Bonmati
 Patricia Guijarro
 Carmen Menayo
 Natalia Montilla
 Lorena Navarro
 Andrea Sierra
 Lara Jenzer
 Alisha Lehmann
 Jolanda Stampfli

Own goal

 Luisa Felder (playing against Spain)
 Naomi Mégroz (playing against Spain)

Team of the tournament

Goalkeepers
 Nadja Furrer
 Amaia Peña
Defenders
 Anna Gerhardt
 Berta Pujadas
 Luisa Felder
 Laia Aleixandri
 Sarah Galera
 Lucía Rodríguez

Midfielders
 Giulia Gwinn
 Patricia Guijarro
 Lara Jenzer
 Maite Oroz
 Aitana Bonmati
Forwards
 Ingrid Kvernvolden
 Stefanie Sanders
 Géraldine Reuteler
 Natalia Montilla
 Lucía García

Golden player:  Stefanie Sanders

References

External links
History – UEFA European Women's Under-17 Championship: 2014/15, UEFA.com
Iceland 2015, UEFA.com
Official website (Football Association of Iceland)

 
2015
Women's Under-17 Championship
2015
UEFA Women's Under-17 Championship
2015 in Icelandic football
2014–15 in German women's football
2014–15 in Spanish women's football
2014–15 in French women's football
2014–15 in Swiss football
2015 in Norwegian women's football
2014–15 in Republic of Ireland women's association football
2014–15 in English women's football
2015 in youth sport
June 2015 sports events in Europe
July 2015 sports events in Europe
2015 in youth association football